Maps is the debut release by Ohio/Detroit-based pop punk band Mixtapes. The album was recorded over one weekend and released for free on Death to False Hope Records. It was later re-released in November 2011 on vinyl via Animal Style Records, featuring the 10 songs from Maps and a newly recorded EP titled Companions. The album was re-titled Maps & Companions.

Track listing

Personnel
Ryan Rockwell – vocals, guitar, keyboard, bass
Maura Weaver – vocals, guitar

Other musicians
Tim Rengers from Fireworks (punk band) – drums

References

2010 debut albums